The Jardin Georges Delaselle is a historic botanical garden located on the Île de Batz, Finistère, in the region of Brittany, France. It is open daily except Tuesday in the warmer months; an admission fee is charged.

The garden was created between 1898-1918 by Parisian insurer Georges Albert Delaselle (1861-1944), who supervised excavation among the island's dunes of a deep, terraced bowl five metres in diameter. There he established an excellent collection of exotic plants, but in 1937 he was forced to sell the property, which in 1957 was reworked to be a summer camp. The garden then fell into disuse for thirty years. In 1987 it was repurchased, and with major investments beginning in 1991 it has subsequently been restored. In 1997 the nonprofit Conservatoire de l’Espace Littoral et des Rivages Lacustres assumed ownership.

Today the garden contains more than 2000 plant species suited to the island's Mediterranean climate, with fine collections of palms, cactus, and succulents. Two-thirds are native to the southern hemisphere, primarily from Chile, South Africa, Australia, and New Zealand. The garden also contains a Bronze Age necropolis with the remains of ten tombs.

See also 
 List of botanical gardens in France

References 

 Jardin Georges Delaselle
 Denis Clavreul, Le jardin de l'île de Batz: Histoire illustrée du jardin exotique de Batz créé par Georges Delaselle, Paris : Gallimard, 2008. .
 Richard Reymann, Île de Batz: Jardin Georges Delaselle,  Actes Sud/Editions locales de France.
 Parcs et Jardins entry (French)
 Conservatoire des Jardins et Paysages entry (French)
 Gralon.net entry (French)

Georges Delaselle, Jardin
Georges Delaselle, Jardin